The 2013 Campeonato Amapaense de Futebol is the 68th edition of the Amapá's top professional football league. The competition began on July, and ended on October 12.

Format
On the first stage all teams play against each other once. The two best teams play against each other to find the round's winner, and the six best advance to the second stage.

On the second stage, all six teams from the first stage play against each other once. The two best teams play against each other to find the second round's winner.

On the final stage, the winner of the first stage play against the winner of the second stage.

Qualifications
The champion qualifies to the 2014 Copa do Brasil and the 2014 Campeonato Brasileiro Série D.

Participating teams

First stage

Standings

Results

Finals

Second stage

Standings

Results

Finals

Championship final

References

Amapaense
2013